The Davis Drive Rapidway is a Canadian bus rapid transit system in Newmarket, Ontario, built by Vivanext. The rapidway opened for service on November 29, 2015. The Viva Yellow service uses the rapidway.

The  Davis Drive rapidway extends from Yonge Street in the west, to Huron Heights Drive in the east.

In November 2009, pre-construction activities, such as utility relocation, planning and geotechnical investigations began for the Davis Drive rapidway. Additional pre-construction activities, such as soil testing, archaeological assessments, building demolition, and removal or relocation of light poles and signs continued through to the end of 2010.

The route required expropriation of land from 133 property owners, most involving "slivers of land." Twenty-two lots of land were purchased, and 34 property owners had not yet settled . As part of construction, two heritage buildings known together as the "Union Hotel" at the corner of Main Street and Davis Drive had to be moved.

Stations
Each station has a glass canopy and enclosed waiting area. For accessibility, each platform is level with bus floors. Stations are equipped with Presto card readers, interactive security monitoring and cameras, and electronic signs reporting next-bus information.

References

Viva Rapid Transit
Transport in Newmarket, Ontario
Busways